The Baltimore Mills Historic Archaeological Site is a historic industrial mill site in Sussex County, Delaware. It consists of an 18th-century mill complex that included water-powered gristmills and sawmills. The area is now an orchard.

The site was listed on the National Register of Historic Places in 1997.

References

Archaeological sites on the National Register of Historic Places in Delaware
Geography of Sussex County, Delaware
National Register of Historic Places in Sussex County, Delaware